The 2022 NHK Trophy will be the fifth event in the 2022-23 ISU Grand Prix of Figure Skating, a senior-level international invitational competition series. It will be held at the Makomanai Ice Arena in Sapporo on November 18-20. Medals will be awarded in the disciplines of men's singles, women's singles, pairs, and ice dance. Skaters earned points toward qualifying for the 2022-23 Grand Prix Final.

Entries 
The International Skating Union announced the preliminary assignments on July 22, 2022.

Changes to preliminary assignments

Results

Men

Women

Pairs

Ice dance

References

External links 
 NHK Trophy at the International Skating Union
  
 Results

2022 NHK Trophy
2022 in figure skating
2022 in Japanese sport
NHK Trophy